Uusi tietosanakirja (1929) is an encyclopedia in Finnish. It was published as a series of 2 volumes in 1929 and 1932. It describes subjects from a Finnish point of view. Chief editor was Väinö Hämeen-Anttila and publisher, Karisto.

Finnish-language encyclopedias
1929 non-fiction books
1932 non-fiction books